Sidney James Pugh (10 October 1919 – 15 April 1944) was an English professional footballer who played as a half back.

Career
Pugh was born in Dartford, and spent his early career with Nunhead and Margate. He joined Arsenal in April 1936 and turned professional two years later, making one appearance for them in the Football League in April 1939. Pugh suffered a kidney injury in that match and never played for Arsenal again. Pugh made one appearance as a wartime guest for Chelsea on 6 April 1940, and another for Bradford City in September 1940. Pugh died while training as a Flying Officer with the Royal Air Force in Seighford on 15 April 1944, and was buried at Llanharan Cemetery, Glamorganshire, Wales.

References

1919 births
1944 deaths
English footballers
Nunhead F.C. players
Margate F.C. players
Arsenal F.C. players
Bradford City A.F.C. wartime guest players
Chelsea F.C. wartime guest players
English Football League players
Association football defenders
Military personnel from Kent
Royal Air Force personnel killed in World War II
Royal Air Force officers